Mpenza is an African surname. Notable people with the surname include:

Mbo Mpenza (born 1976), Belgian footballer of DR Congo descent
Émile Mpenza, Belgian footballer of DR Congo descent, brother of Mbo

See also
Mbenza Bedi, footballer from DR Congo

Surnames of African origin